Waverley Council is a Local government area in the eastern suburbs of Sydney, in the state of New South Wales, Australia. First incorporated on 16 June 1859 as the Municipality of Waverley, it is one of the oldest-surviving local government areas in New South Wales. Waverley is bounded by the Tasman Sea to the east, the Municipality of Woollahra to the north, and the City of Randwick in the south and west. The administrative centre of Waverley Council is located on Bondi Road in Bondi Junction in the Council Chambers on the corner of Waverley Park.

The elected Waverley Council is composed of twelve Councillors elected proportionally across four wards, each electing three Councillors, and the most recent election was held on 4 December 2021. The current Mayor of Waverley Council since September 2019 is Councillor Paula Masselos of Lawson Ward, a member of the Labor Party.

Suburbs and localities in the local government area 
Suburbs within Waverley Council are:

History 
With the enactment of the Municipalities Act of 1858, which allowed for the creation of Municipalities for areas with over 500 electors, several petitions calling for the incorporation of the Waverley area were received by the Colonial Government and published in New South Wales Government Gazette on 11 November 1858 and 17 May 1859. One of the earliest meetings of local residents formed to call for a "Municipality of Waverley" was held at the Tea Gardens Hotel on Bronte Road on 20 December 1858.

The Governor of New South Wales approved the proclamation establishing the Municipality of Waverley on 13 June 1859, and it was subsequently published in the Government Gazette on 16 June 1859. The first returning officer, Charles St Julian, was appointed to conduct the first meeting of electors a few days later. The first election was held on 14 July 1859, with nine Councillors elected proportionately, and the Council first met on 23 July 1859 at the Tea Gardens Hotel, with John Birrell elected as the first chairman. On 21 February 1860, the council was divided into three wards electing three councillors each: Waverley Ward, Bondi Ward and Nelson Ward. A fourth ward covering the western corner of Waverley, Lawson Ward, was added on 22 April 1887, thereby bringing the number of aldermen to 12.

On 6 October 1944, the recommendation of a 1941 NSW Local Government Department Commission of Inquiry removing the Mill Hill area (37 acres) from the Municipality of Randwick and include it in the Waverley Municipality was proclaimed in the Government Gazette.

Council Chambers
The first Council meeting was held on 16 June 1859, but there was no permanent office for the conduct of Council duties some early meetings were held in the Charing Cross Hotel and others in the old School of Arts building in Bronte Road. In December 1860 the Council accepted an offer from Francis O'Brien to donate a site for a Council Chambers in Bondi Road. The cost of building was to be limited to £500, although approximately £700 was eventually spent. The foundation stone was laid in 1861, and a first meeting of Council was held there on 21 November 1861, the first Council building erected by any municipality under the Municipalities Act of 1858.

Discussions were held during the early 1900s over the need for new Council Chambers, and in 1913 a portion of the north-west corner of Waverley Park, which was the first public park in Waverley gazetted in 1880, was dedicated as the site for a new building. A report of the same year stated that the original building was too small for the staff, and had poor ventilation and lighting. It was later sold for £1,600. The new building was completed by the end of 1913, and on 6 January 1914 the Council met for the first time in the new chambers.

Parts of the 1913 chambers still form the shell of the present Council Chambers, although extensive alterations in 1962, and further development in 1976 and 1977 have altered its appearance considerably.

2016–17 amalgamation proposals
Following an independent review, in May 2016 the NSW Government sought to dismiss the council and force its amalgamation with Woollahra and Randwick councils. Woollahra Council instigated legal action claiming that there was procedural unfairness and that a KPMG report at the centre of merger proposals had been "misleading". The matter was heard before the NSW Court of Appeal who, in December 2016, unanimously dismissed Woollahra Council's appeal, finding no merit in its arguments that the proposed merger with Waverley and Randwick councils was invalid. In July 2017, the Berejiklian government decided to abandon the forced merger of the Woollahra, Waverley and Randwick local government areas, along with several other proposed forced mergers.

Demographics 
Aboriginal and Torres Strait Islander people made up 0.4% of the population. The median age of people in Waverley Council was 35 years. Children aged 0 – 14 years made up 15.4% of the population and people aged 65 years and over made up 12.0% of the population. Of people in the area aged 15 years and over, 37.4% were married and 10.0% were either divorced or separated.

Population growth in Waverley Council between the 2001 Census and the 2006 Census was 3.31%; and in the subsequent five years to the 2011 Census, population growth was 4.57%. When compared with total population growth of Australia for the same periods, being 5.78% and 8.32% respectively, population growth in the Waverley local government area was a little over half the national average. The median weekly income for residents within the Municipality of Waverley was more than 1.5 times the national average.

The proportion of residents in Waverley who stated their ancestry was Jewish was three times the New South Wales and national averages. The proportion of households where Russian is spoken at home is thirteen times the state and national averages; and of all households where Hebrew is spoken in New South Wales, one third are located in Waverley, and in Australia, one tenth of households where Hebrew is spoken are located in Waverley. The proportion of residents who stated an affiliation with Judaism was in excess of twenty–eight times the state and national averages.

Council 

NSW Local Government Elections are held every four years on the second Saturday of September as stipulated by the Local Government Act 1993.

Current composition and election method
Waverley Council is composed of twelve Councillors elected proportionally from the four separate wards, each electing three Councillors. The Mayor is elected by the Councillors at the first meeting of the council for a two-year term, typically in September, while the Deputy Mayor is elected annually by the councillors. The most recent election for the council was held on 4 December 2021, and the makeup of the council is as follows:

The current Council, elected in 2021, in order of election by ward, is:

Mayors

Town Clerks and General Managers

Heritage listings
The Waverley Council area has a number of heritage-listed items and conservation areas, including those listed on the New South Wales State Heritage Register:
 Bondi, 36 Anglesea Street: Electricity Substation No. 269
 Bondi, Blair Street: Bondi Ocean Outfall Sewer
 Bondi, 60 Blair Street: St Anne's Catholic Church, Bondi
 Bondi, Military Road: Bondi Sewer Vent
 Bondi Beach, Queen Elizabeth Drive: Bondi Beach Cultural Landscape
 Bondi Junction and Waverley, Paul Street: Waverley Reservoirs
 Bronte, 470 Bronte Road: Bronte House
 Bronte, St Thomas Street: Waverley Cemetery
 North Bondi, Ben Buckler Gun Battery
 Vaucluse, 793 Old South Head Road: South Head General Cemetery
 Waverley, 240 Birrell Street: St Mary's Anglican Church, Waverley
 Waverley, 11 Victoria Street: Charing Cross (homestead)
 Waverley, 45 Victoria Street: Mary Immaculate Catholic Church, Waverley

The Nib Literary Award
The Mark and Evette Moran Nib Literary Award, formerly The Nib Waverley Library Award for Literature, is organised and supported by the council, and the awards ceremony held in Waverley Library each year.

References

External links 

 Waverley Council website

 
Waverley
1859 establishments in Australia
Lists of local government leaders of places in New South Wales